Matrika Prasad Koirala formed the first government of Nepal by a commoner after he was appointed as the prime minister by King Tribhuvan. The government was formed after the previous government under Mohan SJB Rana fell after Nepali Congress ministers resigned. King Tribhuvan made a royal proclamation on 16 November 1951 and invited Matrika Prasad Koirala from the Nepali Congress to form the government.

Matrika Prasad Koirala resigned on 14 August 1952 after dissent in the Nepali Congress against his working methods.

Cabinet

References 

1951 in Nepal
Cabinet of Nepal
Cabinets established in 1951
Cabinets disestablished in 1952
1951 establishments in Nepal
1952 disestablishments in Nepal